Taung Dam is a gravity type dam located on the Harts River near Taung, North West, South Africa. It was established in 1993 and serves mainly for irrigation purposes. Its hazard potential has been ranked high (3).

See also
List of reservoirs and dams in South Africa
List of rivers of South Africa

References 

 List of South African Dams from the Department of Water Affairs and Forestry (South Africa)

Dams in South Africa
Dams completed in 1993